Bambi is the third Korean-language extended play (fourth overall) by South Korean singer Baekhyun. It was released on March 30, 2021, by SM Entertainment. The six-track album includes the singles "Amusement Park", released on December 21, 2020, and the title track "Bambi", which was released on March 30, 2021.

Background
Bambi was announced on March 4, 2021, as Baekhyun's final release before his mandatory military service. SM Entertainment began releasing teasers and a mood-sampler video on March 10 through Exo's official social media accounts.

The album and its title track's music video were released on March 30 at 6PM KST both digitally and physically.

Promotion
An hour before the music video and album's release, Baekhyun appeared on a live broadcast through the Naver app V Live, where he promoted and discussed the album. On April 9, Baekhyun won his first Music Bank trophy with "Bambi". Contrary to his previous album releases, Baekhyun did not attend or perform on any Korean music show, citing his service obligations as the reason.

Commercial performance
On March 30, hours before the album's release, Korean news media reported that pre-orders had surpassed 833,392 copies, making Bambi the most pre-ordered album by a soloist in South Korean history. The record was previously held by Baekhyun's second mini album Delight (2020). Bambi debuted at number one on the week 14 issue of the Gaon Album Chart for the period March 28–April 3, 2021 giving Baekhyun his third domestic chart-topper. With only two days of availability, the album sold a total of 591,944 copies and topped the monthly chart for March. On April 19, it was announced that the album had surpassed 1 million copies sold, making it Baekhyun's second to reach this milestone after Delight.

Internationally, the album debuted at number 15 on Billboards World Albums chart in the United States, giving Baekhyun his third entry on the World ranking.

Track listing

Charts

Weekly charts

Year-end charts

Certifications and sales

Year-end lists

Release history

See also 
 List of best-selling albums in South Korea
 List of K-pop songs on the Billboard charts
 List of K-pop albums on the Billboard charts
 List of Gaon Album Chart number ones of 2021

References

Baekhyun albums
2021 EPs
SM Entertainment albums
Korean-language EPs